DPA may refer to:

Organizations
 Dartmoor Preservation Association, a group which monitors development on Dartmoor in South West England
 Dental Professionals Association, a trade union supporting and representing primary dental care in the UK
 Deutsche Presse-Agentur (German News Agency), a news agency founded in 1949 in Germany
 Digital Pathology Association, a medical society for advancing the field of digital pathology
 DPA Microphones, a Danish manufacturer
 Drug Policy Alliance, an American anti-Drug-War advocacy group
 Dubai Ports Authority, merged with Dubai Ports International in 2005 to form DP World

Government and politics
 California Department of Personnel Administration
 Defence Procurement Agency, an Executive Agency of the United Kingdom Ministry of Defence
 Defense Production Administration, a former independent agency of the United States government
 Definers Public Affairs, an American commercial research and PR firm
 Democratic Party of Albanians, an ethnic Albanian political party in the Republic of North Macedonia
 Democratic Progressive Alliance, an alliance of Indian political parties 
 United Nations Department of Political Affairs, a department of the United Nations Secretariat
 Data protection authority, a role specified by EU General Data Protection Regulation (GDPR)
 Supreme Advisory Council (Dewan Pertimbangan Agung), a defunct Indonesian government body

Law
 Durable power of attorney
 Defensive patent aggregation, the practice of purchasing patents or patent rights
 Deferred prosecution agreement, a voluntary alternative to adjudication in which a prosecutor agrees to grant amnesty in exchange for the defendant agreeing to fulfill certain requirements

Laws
 Defense Production Act of 1950, a United States law
 Defence Production Act (Canada)
 Data Protection Act 1998, a United Kingdom Act of Parliament to regulate the processing of information relating to individuals
 Data Protection Act 2018, a United Kingdom Act of Parliament which updates the Data Protection Act 1998

Computing
 Data presentation architecture, a skill-set that seeks to identify, locate, manipulate, format and present data
 Deterministic pushdown automaton
 Differential power analysis, a cryptographic attack

Entertainment
 Pokémon Diamond and Pearl Adventure!, a manga series
 Drag Point Average, the grading system used on the television show RuPaul's Drag U

Science and technology
 Decipascal (dPa), a SI unit equivalent to one tenth of a pascal
 Diagnostic peritoneal aspiration, a surgical investigation to assess abdominal bleeding
 Diphenylamine, a chemical stabiliser used in homogeneous propellants to absorb the catalyst produced by the autocatalytic decomposition of propellants
 9,10-Diphenylanthracene, an organic compound
 Dipicolinic acid, a chemical compound found in bacterial spores
 Dipicolylamine, an organic compound used as a chelating ligand
 2,2'-Dipyridylamide an organic ion ligand.
 Docosapentaenoic acid, a group of fatty acids
 D-phenylalanine, a stereoisomer of the amino acid, phenylalanine
 Displacements per atom (dpa), in radiation material science, a measure of damage in nuclear materials
16-Dehydropregnenolone acetate (16-DPA), an intermediate in the production of many semisynthetic steroids

Other uses
 Doctor of Public Administration, a terminal research degree in government
 DuPage Airport (IATA code), an airport in West Chicago, DuPage County, Illinois, US
 Data Processing Agreement, according to the General Data Protection Regulation(GDPR)